Benny Higgins  is a Scottish banker, and is the former chief executive officer (CEO) of Tesco Bank.

Upbringing
He was brought up in Prospecthill Circus in Toryglen, Glasgow, Scotland. He attended Holyrood Secondary School in the city.

Career
After achieving a first-class degree in mathematics at The University of Glasgow, Higgins began his career in 1983 at Standard Life in Edinburgh, initially qualifying as an actuary in a then-record 2½ years before becoming an investment manager.

Higgins left in 1997 for the Royal Bank of Scotland, where he became chief executive of Retail Banking and was involved in setting up Tesco Personal Finance (a 50:50 joint venture with Tesco). He was part of the team (alongside Fred Goodwin and George Mathewson) that acquired and integrated NatWest in 2000. At the time of his departure from RBS at the end of 2005 he was chief executive of the Retail Bank which covered both the RBS and NatWest brands.

In January 2006, he took the helm of the Retail Business at HBOS. However, he departed at the end of 2007. During his tenure, Higgins' conservative mortgage strategy led to a fall in the share of the market for new mortgage lending from 16 per cent to 8 per cent, although on announcing Higgins' resignation Hornby explicitly denied any link. Analysts were less kind at the time. "Benny Higgins is carrying the can ... for the mortgage debacle in the first half of this year," one said. "He was supposed to be the next big thing for HBOS, coming in from RBS to shake up the HBOS business. Obviously he's been given his marching orders." As events unfolded, however, even his critics have conceded that he was right and had the courage of his convictions. One journalist said, "He must be the only banker who was fired for being right!"

After a short sabbatical, Higgins returned to banking, taking the position of CEO of Tesco Personal Finance, later renamed to Tesco Bank, following Tesco's buy out of RBS's share of their 50:50 joint venture on 28 July 2008. In 2009, he launched Putting Tesco into Banking and Insurance, a book setting out his vision for Tesco "to become a natural provider of financial services for Tesco Customers". As of 2017, he was chairman of the Regulatory Technology company Kyckr.

In September 2017, First Minister Nicola Sturgeon announced that Higgins would assist the Scottish Government in establishing a Scottish National Investment Bank for Scottish infrastructure investment.

In 2019 he became chairman of the Duke of Buccleuch's estates company, managing the extensive portfolio of property and land owned by the family.

Honours and awards 
In 2018, he was elected a Fellow of the Royal Society of Edinburgh.

Other interests
Higgins was a keen footballer and played for Glasgow Celtic, captaining the youth team in the late 1970s. In 2017, he took on an unpaid role as chairman of the National Galleries of Scotland, and the following year accepted a similar position at Sistema Scotland, a children's orchestra charity (succeeding Richard Holloway).

He has an interest in literature which he has sometimes used to ruthless effect. At an HBOS investor annual results event, Peter Cummings, his then corporate counterpart, told analysts he felt "very, very optimistic" about the future. Higgins followed up by relating the story of Pollyanna, the over-optimistic girl who ended up falling out of a tree.

References

1960 births
Living people
Alumni of the University of Glasgow
Businesspeople from Glasgow
Scottish bankers
People educated at Holyrood Secondary School
Scottish footballers
Celtic F.C. players
Association football defenders
Fellows of the Royal Society of Edinburgh